Ryan Clarke may refer to:
 Ryan Clarke (English footballer) (born 1982)
 Ryan Clarke (Australian footballer) (born 1997), Australian rules footballer
Ryan Clarke, musician in Space (English band)
Ryan Clarke (athlete) in 1998 Central American and Caribbean Junior Championships in Athletics
Ryan Clarke (Australian association footballer) in 2013–14 Perth Glory FC season

See also
Ryan Clark (disambiguation)
Brian Clarke (disambiguation)